József Kellermann (born 5 January 1937) is a Hungarian wrestler. He competed in the men's freestyle featherweight at the 1960 Summer Olympics.

References

External links
 

1937 births
Living people
Hungarian male sport wrestlers
Olympic wrestlers of Hungary
Wrestlers at the 1960 Summer Olympics
Sportspeople from Bács-Kiskun County